Augustijnken ( 1358–1363) was an itinerant entertainer and writer in Middle Dutch.

Augustijnken is sometimes called van Dordt, i.e., from Dordrecht, based on two manuscripts of his Vanden scepe. He was at The Hague in the service of Count William V of Holland in 1358. Soon thereafter he entered the service of John of Blois, lord of Schoonhoven. In 1362 and 1363, he accompanied John on crusade in Prussia, during which he was injured in a bar fight and got in some legal trouble. Official records refer to him as a "storyteller", that is, a paid entertainer for the troops.

Seven works by Augustijnken are known, all relatively short. These are:

Expositie, a learned exposition of the prologue of the Gospel of John and Augustijnken's longest work at around 1000 lines
Dryvoldicheit, a religious poem in 316 lines about Creation and the Trinity, with special symbolic significance given to the number seven
Vanden scepe, an allegorical short story, narrated in the first person, of a walk along and boat ride on the Merwede
Vrouwenborch, an allegory of a virtuous woman's body
Mich heeft een ridder
Lijd den tijt
Van der rijcheit

Augustijnken's work is preserved in nine different manuscripts that date to between about 1350 and 1469. Four of his pieces are found in multiple manuscripts, but three survive in single copies. The  contains four of his works, the most of any single manuscript.

Augustijnken is usually treated as a "lesser colleague" of his near-contemporary, .

Notes

Bibliography

 

Middle Dutch writers
14th-century people of the Holy Roman Empire
Christians of the Prussian Crusade